Travis Lemar Dixon is an American media studies scholar and Professor of Communication at the University of Illinois at Urbana-Champaign. He is known for researching racial and religious stereotyping in television news in the United States, as well as audiences' reception of rap music.

References

External links
Faculty page

Living people
Media studies writers
Communication scholars
African-American academics
University of Illinois Urbana-Champaign faculty
University of California, Los Angeles alumni
University of California, Santa Barbara alumni
Year of birth missing (living people)
21st-century African-American people